The nociceptin opioid peptide receptor (NOP), also known as the nociceptin/orphanin FQ (N/OFQ) receptor or kappa-type 3 opioid receptor, is a protein that in humans is encoded by the OPRL1 (opioid receptor-like 1) gene. The nociceptin receptor is a member of the opioid subfamily of G protein-coupled receptors whose natural ligand is the 17 amino acid neuropeptide known as nociceptin (N/OFQ). This receptor is involved in the regulation of numerous brain activities, particularly instinctive and emotional behaviors. Antagonists targeting NOP are under investigation for their role as treatments for depression and Parkinson's disease, whereas NOP agonists have been shown to act as powerful, non-addictive painkillers in non-human primates.

Although NOP shares high sequence identity (~60%) with the ‘classical’ opioid receptors μ-OP (MOP), κ-OP (KOP), and δ-OP (DOP), it possesses little or no affinity for opioid peptides or morphine-like compounds. Likewise, classical opioid receptors possess little affinity towards NOP's endogenous ligand nociceptin, which is structurally related to dynorphin A.

Discovery
In 1994, Mollereau et al. cloned a receptor that was highly homologous to the classical opioid receptors (OPs) μ-OR (MOP), κ-OR (KOP), and δ-OR (DOP) that came to be known as the Nociceptin Opioid Peptide receptor (NOP). As these “classical” opioid receptors were identified 30 years earlier in the mid-1960s, the physiological and pharmacological characterization of NOP as well as therapeutic development targeting this receptor remain decades behind. Although research on NOP has blossomed into its own sub-field, the lack of widespread knowledge of NOP's existence means that it is commonly omitted from studies that investigate the OP family, despite its promising role as a therapeutic target.

Mechanism and pharmacology

NOP cellular signalling partners 
Like most G-protein coupled receptors, NOP signals through canonical G proteins upon activation. G proteins are heterotrimeric complexes consisting of α, β, and γ subunits. NOP signals through a variety of Gα subtypes that trigger diverse downstream signaling cascades. NOP coupling to Gαi or Gαo subunits leads to an inhibition of adenylyl cyclase (AC) causing an intracellular decrease in cyclic adenosine monophosphate(cAMP) levels, an important second messenger for many signal transduction pathways. NOP acting through Gαi/o pathways has also been shown to activate Phospholipase A2 (PLA2), thereby initiating Mitogen-activated protein kinase (MAPK) signaling cascades. In contrast to classical OPs, NOP also couples to Pertussis toxin (PTX)-insensitive subtypes Gαz, Gα14, and Gα16, as well as potentially to Gα12 and Gαs. Activation of NOP's canonical β-arrestin pathway causes receptor phosphorylation, internalization, and eventual downregulation and recycling. NOP activation also causes indirect inhibition of opioid receptors MOP and KOP, resulting in anti-opioid activity in certain tissues. Additionally, NOP activation leads to the activation of potassium channels and inhibition of calcium channels which collectively inhibit neuronal firing.

Neuroanatomy 
Nociceptin controls a wide range of biological functions ranging from nociception to food intake, from memory processes to cardiovascular and renal functions, from spontaneous locomotor activity to gastrointestinal motility, from anxiety to the control of neurotransmitter release at peripheral and central sites.

Pain circuitry 
The outcome of NOP activation on the brain's pain circuitry is site-specific. Within the central nervous system its action can be either similar or opposite to those of opioids depending on their location.  In animal models, activation of NOP in the brain stem and higher brain regions has mixed action, resulting in overall anti-opioid activity. NOP activation at the spinal cord and peripheral nervous system results in morphine-comparable analgesia in non-human primates.

Reward circuitry 
NOP is highly expressed in every node of the mesocorticolimbic reward circuitry. Unlike MOP agonists such as codeine and morphine, NOP agonists do not have reinforcing effects. Nociceptin is thought to be an endogenous antagonist of dopamine transport that may act either directly on dopamine or by inhibiting GABA to affect dopamine levels. In animal models, the result of NOP activation in the central nervous system has been shown to eliminate conditioned place preference induced by morphine, cocaine, alcohol, and methamphetamine.

Therapeutic potential

Analgesia and abuse liability 
Recent studies indicate that targeting NOP is a promising alternative route to relieving pain without the deleterious side effects of traditional MOP-activating opioid therapies. In primates, specifically activating NOP through systemic or intrathecal administration induces long-lasting, morphine-comparable analgesia without causing itch, respiratory depression, or the reinforcing effects that lead to addiction in an intravenous self-administration paradigm; thus eliminating all of the serious side-effects of current opioid therapies.

Several commonly used opioid drugs including etorphine and buprenorphine have been demonstrated to bind to nociceptin receptors, but this binding is relatively insignificant compared to their activity at other opioid receptors in the acute setting (however the non-analgesic NOPr antagonist SB-612,111 was demonstrated to potentiate the therapeutic benefits of morphine). Chronic administration of nociceptin receptor agonists results in an attenuation of the analgesic and anti-allodynic effects of opiates; this mechanism inhibits the action of endogenous opioids as well, resulting in an increase in pain severity, depression, and both physical and psychological opiate dependence following chronic NOPr agonist administration. Administration of the NOPr antagonist SB-612,111 has been shown to inhibit this process. More recently a range of selective ligands for NOP have been developed, which show little or no affinity to other opioid receptors and so allow NOP-mediated responses to be studied in isolation.

Agonists
 AT-121 (Experimental agonist of both the µ-opioid and nociceptin receptors, showing promising results in non-human primates.)
 Buprenorphine (partial agonist, not selective for NOP, also partial agonist of µ-opioid receptors, and competitive antagonist of δ-opioid and κ-opioid receptors)
 BU08028 (Analogue of buprenorphine, partial agonist, agonist of µ-opioid receptor, has analgesic properties without physical dependence.)
 Cebranopadol (full agonist at NOP, μ-opioid and δ-opioid receptors, partial agonist at κ-opioid receptor)
 Etorphine
 MCOPPB (full agonist)
 MT-7716
 Nociceptin
 Norbuprenorphine (full agonist; non-selective (also full agonist at the MOR and DOR and partial agonist at the KOR); peripherally-selective)
 NNC 63-0532
 Ro64-6198
 Ro65-6570
 SCH-221,510
 SR-8993
 SR-16435 (mixed MOR / NOP partial agonist)
 TH-030418

Antagonists
 AT-076 (non-selective)
 JTC-801
 J-113,397
 LY-2940094
 SB-612,111
 SR-16430
 Thienorphine

Applications
NOP agonists are being studied as treatments for heart failure and migraine while nociceptin antagonists such as JTC-801 may have analgesic and antidepressant qualities.

References

Further reading

External links 
 
 
 

G protein-coupled receptors